Toms Place (formerly Hans Lof's) is an unincorporated community in Mono County, California. The ZIP Code is 93546.

Hans Lof started a resort at the place called Hans Lof's in 1919. Tom Yernby bought the place in 1922 and renamed it. The Toms Place post office opened in 1963.

Notable residents
 James Whitmore owned several homes and made it his primary residence for many years.  Members of his family still live in Toms Place as of 2013

See also

References

External links

Unincorporated communities in California
Unincorporated communities in Mono County, California